Canela, meaning Cinnamon in Portuguese, is a town located in the Serra Gaúcha of Rio Grande do Sul, Brazil. Both Canela and neighboring Gramado are important tourist locations and they both draw many visitors each year.  Ecotourism is very popular in the area and there are many opportunities for hiking, rock climbing, horseback riding and river rafting.

Tourism 

The main tourist attraction in Canela is the Parque do Caracol, the Cathedral of Stone, and Caracol Falls (Cascata do Caracol). Like sister town Gramado, Canela is a large tourist draw during the winter, where snowfall can occur, and during the Christmas holiday and the local town council deck Canela with lights and other festive decorations.

Canela is part of the Rota Romântica or Romantic Route, a scenic bypass.

An imitation of the Montparnasse derailment has been built outside the Mundo a Vapor ("Steam World") museum theme park in the city.

Gallery

Transportation 

Canela is served by Canela Airport.

See also 
 Canela Preta Biological Reserve

References 

 Literature on Canela

External links

Portal turístico de Gramado e Canela
Canela City Hall
Canela detailed city Street Map
Canela Tourism site including ecotourism like Rafting
Canela Tourism and Services Guide with many pictures

Municipalities in Rio Grande do Sul